Cotan may refer to:

 Cotangent, abbreviated as cotan, a trigonometric function

People with the surname
 Alin Coțan (born 1982), Romanian footballer
 Antonio Cotán (born 1995), Spanish footballer
 Imron Cotan (born 1954), Indonesian diplomat
 Juan Sánchez Cotán (1560–1627), Spanish painter of still lives

See also 
 Kotan (disambiguation)